The 1923 St. Louis Cardinals season was the team's 42nd season in St. Louis, Missouri and its 32nd season in the National League. The Cardinals went 79–74 during the season and finished 5th in the National League.

Regular season 
Rogers Hornsby set a major league record of 13 consecutive games with two or more base hits, accomplished July 5 through July 18, 1923.

Season standings

Record vs. opponents

Roster

Player stats

Batting

Starters by position 
Note: Pos = Position; G = Games played; AB = At bats; H = Hits; Avg. = Batting average; HR = Home runs; RBI = Runs batted in

Other batters 
Note: G = Games played; AB = At bats; H = Hits; Avg. = Batting average; HR = Home runs; RBI = Runs batted in

Pitching

Starting pitchers 
Note: G = Games pitched; IP = Innings pitched; W = Wins; L = Losses; ERA = Earned run average; SO = Strikeouts

Other pitchers 
Note: G = Games pitched; IP = Innings pitched; W = Wins; L = Losses; ERA = Earned run average; SO = Strikeouts

Relief pitchers 
Note: G = Games pitched; W = Wins; L = Losses; SV = Saves; ERA = Earned run average; SO = Strikeouts

Awards and honors

League leaders 
Rogers Hornsby, National League batting champion

Farm system

References

External links
1923 St. Louis Cardinals at Baseball Reference
1923 St. Louis Cardinals team page at www.baseball-almanac.com

St. Louis Cardinals seasons
Saint Louis Cardinals season
St Louis